Vutukuru Rami Reddy (1 July 1918 – 15 April 1995) was an Indian politician. He was elected to the Lok Sabha, the lower house of the Parliament of India as a member of the Indian National Congress.He did his graduation in Loyola College and his law degree in Madras Law College.
 

Reddy died in Andhra Pradesh on 15 April 1995, at the age of 76.

References

External links
Official biographical sketch in Parliament of India website

1918 births
1995 deaths
India MPs 1957–1962
Indian National Congress politicians
Lok Sabha members from Andhra Pradesh